West Columbia is the name of the following towns in the United States:

 West Columbia, South Carolina
 West Columbia, Texas
 West Columbia, West Virginia